Deschloroketamine (DXE, DCK, 2'-Oxo-PCM) is a dissociative anesthetic that has been sold online as a designer drug. It has also been proposed for the treatment of bacterial, fungal, viral or protozoal infections and for immunomodulation at doses of 2 mg per day.

History 
In 2019, it became part of a group of molecules studied by the French laboratory Caulredaitens.

Legal status 
Deschloroketamine is illegal in Latvia, and is covered by blanket bans in Canada and the UK.

See also 
 Ketamine
 2-Fluorodeschloroketamine
 3-Fluorodeschloroketamine
 Bromoketamine
 Methoxmetamine
 Trifluoromethyldeschloroketamine
 Rhynchophylline

References 

Arylcyclohexylamines
Designer drugs
Dissociative drugs
Ketones
NMDA receptor antagonists